Odynerus is a primarily Holarctic genus of potter wasps.

The name of this genus has been widely used as a root to construct many other genus-level names for potter wasps with non-petiolated metasoma, such as Euodynerus, Acarodynerus, Stenodynerus, Parodontodynerus and Incodynerus.

Species
A partial species list of the hundreds of species classified under Odynerus is set out below:

 Odynerus acuticarinatus (Cameron, 1909)
 Odynerus acutocarinatus Cameron, 1909
 Odynerus areatus Fox, 1902
 Odynerus dorsonotatus Fox, 1902
 Odynerus eburneofasciatus Dusmet, 1903
 Odynerus ezechiae Schulthess, 1923 
 Odynerus herbertii Fox, 1902
 Odynerus jeromensis Cameron, 1909
 Odynerus longicornus Fox, 1902
 Odynerus melanocephalus (Gmeling, 1790)
 Odynerus pacator Giordani Soika, 1960 
 Odynerus pallidus Zavattari, 1912 
 Odynerus rufimaculus Fox, 1902
 Odynerus simillimus Morawitz, 1867
 Odynerus simplex Bingham, 1902
 Odynerus spinipes (Linnaeus, 1758)
 Odynerus striatus (Fox, 1902)
 Odynerus zhelochovtzewi Kostylev, 1929

References

Potter wasps
Hymenoptera genera